The Division of Herbert is an Australian electoral division in the state of Queensland. Eligible voters within the Division elect a single representative, known as the member for Herbert, to the Australian House of Representatives. It covers the city of Townsville.

Geography
Since 1984, federal electoral division boundaries in Australia have been determined at redistributions by a redistribution committee appointed by the Australian Electoral Commission. Redistributions occur for the boundaries of divisions in a particular state, and they occur every seven years, or sooner if a state's representation entitlement changes or when divisions of a state are malapportioned.

History

The division was proclaimed in 1900, and was one of the original 65 divisions at the first federal election. It is located in northern Queensland, and is named after Sir Robert Herbert, the first Premier of Queensland (1859–1866). It has always been based around the city of Townsville.

On its original boundaries, it covered most of north-eastern Queensland, stretching from Mackay to the Torres Strait. Much of its northern portion, including Cairns and the Cape York Peninsula, transferred to Kennedy in 1934 (these areas are now part of Leichhardt. Its south-eastern portion, including Mackay, became Dawson in 1949. By 1984, successive redistributions cut back the seat to little more than Townsville and its inner suburbs.

The seat had long been one of Australia's noteworthy bellwether seats. It was won by the party of government for all but two terms from the 1966 election until the 2007 election, where it was hotly contested with local identity and businessman George Colbran pre-selected by Labor to contest Herbert, however Liberal incumbent Peter Lindsay managed to retain the seat with a wafer-thin 50.2 percent two-party vote from a 6 percent two-party swing while his party lost government. Ewen Jones of the merged Liberal National Party succeeded Lindsay and retained the seat at the following two elections with increased margins.

Herbert featured the closest result of any division at the 2016 federal election. Following a recount, the Australian Electoral Commission confirmed on 31 July that Labor's Cathy O'Toole defeated the LNP incumbent by 37 votes, becoming the first Labor member to win the seat since 1996. The LNP considered a legal challenge to the result.

Members

Election results

References

External links
 Division of Herbert (Qld) — Australian Electoral Commission

Electoral divisions of Australia
Constituencies established in 1901
1901 establishments in Australia
Federal politics in Queensland
Townsville